The Réquillard 1910 monoplane was a French experimental monoplane aircraft built in the early 1910s.

Specifications

References

Further reading

Single-engined tractor aircraft
Aircraft first flown in 1910